Mother's Joy is a 1923 American silent comedy film starring Stan Laurel.

Cast

See also
 List of American films of 1923
 Stan Laurel filmography

References

External links

1923 films
1923 short films
American silent short films
American black-and-white films
1923 comedy films
Films directed by Ralph Ceder
Silent American comedy films
American comedy short films
1920s American films